Gore is a given name. It may refer to:

Gore Browne (1764–1843), British Army officer and politician
Gore Ouseley (1770–1844), British baron, entrepreneur, linguist, and diplomat
Gore Verbinski (born 1964), American film director, screenwriter, producer, and musician
Gore Vidal (1925–2012), American writer, politician, and public intellectual

See also
Richard Corben (pen-name: Gore; 1940–2020), American illustrator and comic book artist